The 2010–11 Miami RedHawks men's basketball team represented Miami University in the 2010–11 NCAA Division I men's basketball season. The RedHawks, led by head coach Charlie Coles, played their home games at Millett Hall in Oxford, Ohio, as members of the Mid-American Conference. The RedHawks finished second in the MAC's East Division during the regular season, and earned the third seed in the MAC tournament. Miami was upset in their first game, losing in the quarterfinals to eventual tournament champion Akron.

Miami failed to qualify for the NCAA tournament, but were invited to the 2011 College Basketball Invitational. The RedHawks were eliminated in the first round of the CBI in a loss to Rhode Island, 76–59.

Roster 

Source

Schedule and results

|-
!colspan=9 style=|Exhibition

|-
!colspan=9 style=|Regular season

|-
!colspan=9 style=| MAC tournament

|-
!colspan=9 style=| CBI

Source

References

Miami RedHawks men's basketball seasons
Miami
Miami
Miami men's basketball
Miami men's basketball